Union Touarga Sport is a professional football club based in the Touarga district of  Rabat, Morocco, that competes in Botola, the top flight of Moroccan football. The club was founded in 1969.

Honours
GNF 2 Moroccan Championship: 1
1986
Second Place : 2004

Moroccan GNFA 1 Championship: 1
2003

References

Football clubs in Morocco
Sport in Rabat
Association football clubs established in 1969
1969 establishments in Morocco
Sports clubs in Morocco